Thangjam Saran Singh (born 1 March 1987) is an Indian footballer who plays as a midfielder for Mumbai City FC in the Indian Super League on loan from Salgaocar F.C. of the I-League.

Early career
Singh was born to Late Thangjam Sanatomba Singh and Thangjam Radhe Devi at Yumnam Khonou, Imphal. He is the youngest amongst four sisters and three brothers. Football came naturally to him as most of his family members along with his father were into football though no one played professionally.

As a kid, he used to watch local matches where his family members used to play and started falling in love with the beautiful game, himself. But Singh's father had other plans for his son. He wanted to see him as an Army man one day and Singh was enrolled into Sainik School, Imphal through which he had a chance to make the cut for the National Defense Academy.

Singh was little disappointed but he had to go according to his father's wishes but in Sanik School he got involved more into football as he was quickly selected in the school team. With the team, he played in many tournaments, prominent ones being the Inter Sainik Schools East Zone Tournaments and the Subroto Mukherjee Football tournament in 2000 at New Delhi. Along with football, Singh also pursued his love for athletics and won many best athlete awards during his years at the Sainik School.

Career
After passing out from School, Singh joined DM College, Imphal and played in many inter college tournaments. He was selected to represent Manipur University in the All India Inter University tournament which was held in West Bengal. Along with the College team he also played for many local clubs in the Manipur State League - YOSE FC, USA FC and YWC Thambal Khang being the prominent ones.

He also represented the Manipur Under-21 team in 2 National Tournaments and by then had become confident of himself to take that big step of turning professional and playing for one of the best clubs in India.

Churchill Brothers
He was confused about this but help came from his senior Itocha Singh who was playing at Churchill Brothers S.C. during that time and Singh's name was referred to the club by Itocha. So in 2007 Singh signed for Churchill Brothers. In 2009 Singh suffered a major knee injury and had to undergo a surgery.

It might be mentioned here Singh has just played for one other club in his career thus far. In 2009-10 I-League season he had donned the colours of JCT FC in the I-League but he quickly came back to Goa again.

Singh has quietly achieved so much success with Churchill Brothers, winning the I-league 2 times, IFA Shield on one occasion and 3 Durand Cups and to top it all up, he has also played an important role in the club's maiden Indian Federation Cup victory in January 2014.

Salgaocar
On 30 July 2014 it was confirmed that Thangjam has signed for Salgaocar F.C. He scored the winner for Salgaocar in 2014 Durand Cup final.

Honours

Club

Churchill Bros
. I-League (2): 2008–09, 2012-13
. Durand Cup (3): 2007, 2009, 2011, 2014
. Federation Cup (1): 2014
. IFA Shield (1): 2011 IFA Shield
. Goa Professional League (1): 2008

References

Living people
Indian footballers
Footballers from Manipur
I-League players
1987 births
Churchill Brothers FC Goa players
JCT FC players
Salgaocar FC players
Association football midfielders
Association football fullbacks
Sainik School alumni